Beris hauseri is a European species of soldier fly.

Distribution
Canada, United States, Austria, Belgium, Czech Republic, Estonia, Finland, Germany, Hungary, Italy, Netherlands, Norway, Poland, Romania, Slovakia, Sweden, Switzerland, Ukraine, Mongolia, Russia.

References

Stratiomyidae
Diptera of Europe
Diptera of North America
Diptera of Asia
Insects described in 2004